Leviticus was a Christian metal band from Sweden. The band formed in 1981 and was led by Bjorn Stigsson. They released four albums before breaking up in 1990.

Background 
The band's early releases were metal with symphonic influences using the Roland synthesizer guitar and Moog Taurus pedals. Knights of Heaven showed a move toward a more melodic rock based sound.

In 1986 the band went through lineup changes: Ez Gomér was brought in to replace Håkan Andersson on bass, and Terry Haw joined. Both were with the band through Setting Fire to the Earth (1987), then left to form Jet Circus. With this lineup they toured extensively in Europe throughout 1986–1987.

They played the Greenbelt festival in England three times, 1984, 1985, and 1987, and the Scandinavium in Gothenburg twice (1985, 1987). The second appearance at the Scandinavium was with a festival, and was filmed by Sveriges Television.

In early '88 they toured again in Sweden and in April they returned to England. Their first United States tour was in August 1988, when they opened for Larry Norman and played as his backup band. In fall of that year they toured for two months throughout Europe. together with Bloodgood and concluded the year playing the Ennepetal Christmas Rock Night festival in Germany for the second time.

In 1989 they did touring again in Australia and completed two tours in the USSR. The same year they recorded Knights of Heaven in Los Angeles, produced by John Elefante.

Before breaking up in the latter part on 1990 they again toured in the United States and Canada.

The band (Jet Circus) did make an American appearance at the "Cornerstone" festival in Bushnell, Ill., the weekend of July 4, 1991.

The band re-formed in March 2003 to play at the final Bobfest. The show was recorded by Sveriges Radio and released to CD. The final Leviticus show was held in Hjo Sweden June 2003 a festival gig together with Swedish metal giants In Flames.

In 2011, Leviticus celebrated their 30 years anniversary with a concert, on May 7, 2011, at Valhall in Skövde, Sweden. The line-up was the same as on Bobfest, 2003, with only one exception: Håkan Andersson replaced Niklas Franklin on the bass guitar, and also performed vocals. They have continued to play since.

Side projects
Gomer and Haw joined with drummer Little George to form Jet Circus in 1988. Jet Circus's first album, Step On It (1991), had a proto-rapcore sound. It was distributed in Europe by Pila Records, and introduced to the United States by Doug Van Pelt, Editor of HM Magazine. Despite quality issues due to its mastering Van Pelt dubbed it "the most creative release in Christian metal in 1990." After a long hiatus the band released No Mercy For The Living Dead in 2003. Ez also released a solo album – which became a Jet Circus album, when Terry left the band – entitled Look At Death Now in 2005. This album features artists including Mikkey Dee of Motörhead, Stefan Elmgren of HammerFall, and The Swedish Radio Symphony Orchestra. They have since released a remix album entitled Dance or Die.

Following the end of Leviticus, Stigsson formed XT with Sonny Larson. XT released three albums. Stigsson also released a solo project in 1987 entitled Together With Friends.
Peo Pettersson is still active in numerous projects ex. Staggerwing, Sinisis and King & dreams.

Members

Current members
 Håkan Andersson - Bass (1981-1986, 1987-1988, 2011–present), Vocals (1981-1986), Keyboards (1981-1988)
 Kjell Andersson - Drums (1981-1990, 2003, 2011–present)
 Björn Stigsson - Guitar (1981-1990, 2003, 2011–present), Keyboards (1981-1989)
 Peo Pettersson - Vocals (1989-1990, 2003, 2011–present), Keyboards (1989-1990)
 Niklas Edberger - Keyboards (2003, 2011–present)

Former Members
 Sven "EZ" Gomer – bass, vocals, keyboards (1986–1987)
 Terje "Terry Haw" Hjortander – lead vocals (1986–1987)
 Sonny Larsson – lead vocals (1987–1988)
 Nicklas Franklin – bass (1988–1990, 2003)
 Dan Tibell – keyboards (1988)

Timeline

Discography
1982: Stå och titta på (EP)
1983: I Shall Conquer/Jag ska segra (Shadow/Talking Music, Re-Released by M8 in 2000)
1984: Let Me Fight - Day By Day (12" single, Talking Music TALKS 1014)
1985: The Strongest Power (Twilight) Re-Released by M8 in 2000 (One of the best records of the year ) Mark Putterford Kerrang Magazine !!
1987: Setting Fire to the Earth (Royal, Review: CCM Magazine)
1987: Together With Friends – Björn Stigsson (solo album with Leviticus members)
1989: Knights of Heaven (Invasion)
1993: Best of Leviticus (Viva)
2003: Live at Bobfest 2003 (BTS Records)

References

Notes

Citations

External links 
Jet Circus:
 Ez Gomer's Jet Circus site
 Jet Circus album reviews

Swedish Christian metal musical groups